Torry Run is a  long 2nd order tributary to Conneauttee Creek in Crawford County, Pennsylvania and Erie County, Pennsylvania.  This is the only stream of this name in the United States.

Course
Torry Run rises about 1.5 miles southwest of Edinboro, Pennsylvania, and then flows generally southeast to join Conneauttee creek about 0.5 miles south of Drakes Mills.

Watershed
Torry Run drains  of area, receives about 45.0 in/year of precipitation, has a wetness index of 469.47, and is about 51% forested.

See also
 List of rivers of Pennsylvania

References

Rivers of Pennsylvania
Rivers of Crawford County, Pennsylvania
Rivers of Erie County, Pennsylvania